DZCA (105.9 FM), broadcasting as CAT College Radio 105.9, was a radio station owned and operated by the Computer Arts and Technological College. Its studios are located at the CATC Bldg., Balintawak St., Legazpi.

References

Radio stations in Legazpi, Albay
Radio stations established in 1999
College radio stations in the Philippines
Defunct radio stations in the Philippines